Sardinella fimbriata (fringescale sardinella) is a species of ray-finned fish in the genus Sardinella.

Footnotes 
 

fimbriata
Fish described in 1847